Adrian Croitoru (born 24 February 1971) is a Romanian judoka. He competed at three Olympic Games.

Achievements

References

External links
 

1971 births
Living people
Romanian male judoka
Judoka at the 1992 Summer Olympics
Judoka at the 1996 Summer Olympics
Judoka at the 2000 Summer Olympics
Olympic judoka of Romania
20th-century Romanian people
21st-century Romanian people